A closed concept is a concept where all the necessary and sufficient conditions required to include something within the concept can be listed. For example, the concept of a triangle is closed because it is a three-sided polygon, and only a three-sided polygon, is a triangle. All the conditions required to call something a triangle can be, and are, are listed.

Its opposite is an "open concept".

See also

 Continuum fallacy

References

External links
 Open and Closed Concepts and the Continuum Fallacy - More on open and closed concepts
 Necessary Conditions and Sufficient Conditions - A guide to the usage and application of necessary and sufficient conditions

Concepts in epistemology